Clearwater River Dene Band 222 is an Indian reserve of the Clearwater River Dene Nation in Saskatchewan. It is 11 kilometers southwest of La Loche. In the 2016 Canadian Census, it recorded a population of 822 living in 188 of its 218 total private dwellings. In the same year, its Community Well-Being index was calculated at 49 of 100, compared to 58.4 for the average First Nations community and 77.5 for the average non-Indigenous community.

References

Indian reserves in Saskatchewan
Division No. 18, Saskatchewan